British migration to Portugal has resulted in Portugal being home to one of the largest British-born populations outside of the United Kingdom. Migration from the UK to Portugal has increased rapidly since the late 1990s and the estimated population of British nationals in Portugal in 2006 was 49,000, including 11,000 living in Portugal for part of the year.

Education
There are a few British international schools located in Portugal, mainly the Oporto British School, St. Julian's School and Saint Dominic's International School.

Media
There are several English printed newspapers available in Portugal, The Portugal News is an English-language weekly newspaper, which is the oldest in publication in Portugal.

Retirement
The United Kingdom and Portugal signed the UK/Portugal Income Tax convention in 1968 which was created to avoid Double taxation, meaning that British citizens who have Tax residence in Portugal, do not pay tax on their income from foreign sources such as pensions for the first 10 years.

See also 
Demographics of Portugal
Portuguese in the United Kingdom
Portugal–United Kingdom relations

References 

Portugal
Ethnic groups in Portugal